Eazy may refer to:

"Eazy" (song), by Kanye West and the Game, 2022
"Eazy", a song by G-Eazy from The Beautiful & Damned, 2017
"Eazy", a song by Nasty C, 2020
Eazy-E (1964–1995), American rapper

See also
Easy (disambiguation)
EZ (disambiguation)